Tabletop games or tabletops are games that are normally played on a table or other flat surface, such as board games, card games, dice games, miniature wargames, or tile-based games.

Classification according to equipment used
Tabletop games can be classified according to the general form, or equipment utilized:

Games like chess and draughts are examples of games belonging to the board game category. Other games, however, use various attributes and cannot be classified unambiguously (e.g. Monopoly utilises a board as well as dice and cards).

For several of these categories there are sub-categories and even sub-sub-categories or genres. For instance, German-style board games, board wargames, and roll-and-move games are all types of board games that differ markedly in style and general interest.

Tabletop game components
The various specialized parts, pieces, and tools used for playing tabletop games may include:

 Coins
 Stopwatch, clock, hourglass or egg timer
 Counter, pawn, or playing piece
 Dice, which can include polyhedral dice
 Dice cup
 Gambling chips or play money
 Game board
 Game box or container
 Scoreboard or paper pad
 Marker or peg for keeping score/tally
 Miniature figures
 Pencil
 Playing cards, which can be collectible cards
 Rule manuals
 Ruler or measuring device
 Tiles
 Modelling clay

A refereed game could also include various aids to play, including scenario packs and computer game aids. Role-playing games can include campaign settings and various supplementary manuals and notes.

Classification according to elements of chance

As an alternative to classifying games by equipment, they can also be classified according to the elements of chance involved.
In game theory, two fundamentally different elements of chance can play a role:
 Chance due to outcome uncertainty, e.g. due to dice rolls or due to unknown cards being dealt during the game. Games in which outcome uncertainty plays a role are referred to as stochastic games as opposed to deterministic games.
 Chance due to state uncertainty, e.g. due to the opponent's position or cards not being visible, or due to the simultaneous move character of the game. Games in which state uncertainty plays a role are referred to as partial or imperfect information games as opposed to full or perfect information games.

Examples of the chance classification for some well-known tabletop games are given in the table below.

Organizations

List of organizations that sponsor events featuring tabletop games:
 Board Game Geek organizes BGG.CON
 PAX hosts PAX Unplugged
 Geek & Sundry promotes an annual International TableTop Day
 The Organization of Gamers & Roleplaying Enthusiasts (O.G.R.E.s) organizes tabletop events for OMGcon
 White Wolf Publishing's Camarilla
 Wizards of the Coast own RPGA
 The Historical Miniatures Gaming Society promotes historical miniatures wargaming and organizes wargaming events such as Historicon
 SaltCON LLC organizes SaltCON and the Ion Award competition for unpublished tabletop games

Numerous independent, local groups run by gamers exist to play tabletop games.  Additionally, many colleges have student run organizations pertaining solely to table top gaming. The Collegiate Association of Table Top Gamers is one such organization that has a few chapters at different schools.

Digital tabletop games 

Digital tabletops games are digital variations of tabletop games, which include straight reproductions of existing physical tabletop games, video games that use tabletop game principles as part of their gameplay mechanics, and tabletop simulators that provide a virtual tabletop for conducting tabletop games online.

See also

References